Jogmai Khola Hydropower Station (Nepali: जोग माई खोला जलविद्युत आयोजना) is a run-of-river hydro-electric plant located in   Ilam District of Nepal. The flow from Jogmai River is used to generate 7.6 MW electricity. The plant is owned and developed by Sanvi Energy Pvt. Ltd., an IPP of Nepal. The plant started generating electricity from 2074-01-18BS. The generation licence will expire in 2104-12-28 BS, after which the plant will be handed over to the government.  The power station is connected to the national grid and the electricity is sold to Nepal Electricity Authority.

See also

List of power stations in Nepal

References

Hydroelectric power stations in Nepal
Gravity dams
Run-of-the-river power stations
Dams in Nepal
Irrigation in Nepal
Buildings and structures in Ilam District